Rugby League is a rugby league video game series developed by Sidhe Interactive, Wicked Witch Software, and Big Ant Studios. The first games was Rugby League, released on 9 December 2003. The latest game released was Rugby League Live 4, released on 20 July 2017 for  PlayStation 4 and Xbox One.

History
Tru Blu Entertainment has published several major Southern Hemisphere-focused rugby league games since the release of its first three rugby league video games: E.T.'s Rugby League in 1992, Australian Rugby League in 1995, and ARL '96 in 1996.

The Rugby League franchise started in 2003 when Rugby League was released by Sidhe Interactive and Tru Blu Entertainment. This led to Rugby League 2 in late 2005 and the World Cup Edition (a content update of RL2) in 2008. In 2009, Wicked Witch Software released two off-series games on the Nintendo DS and PlayStation Portable and Rugby League 3 was released. Big Ant Studios in 2010 starting releasing the Rugby League Live series in 2010. Rugby League Live 2 followed in 2012, again developed by Big Ant Studios.

On 31 May 2013, Tru Blu Entertainment announced Rugby League Live 2 would receive an update to the game, the 2013 season pack, developed by Melbourne's Big Ant Studios. It features an update to the 2013 season of rugby league; team Kits, roster updates, new 2013 competitions, new and updated stadiums, sponsors and a number of other features and improvements. The update was released on 19 June 2013, as DLC on PlayStation 3 and Xbox 360.

Wicked Witch Software created Rugby League Live 2 for iOS, which was released in 2013 and later on Android.

Rugby League Live 3 was released by Big Ant Studios in September 2015 on seventh-gen and eighth-gen consoles as well as Microsoft Windows.

On 9 May 2017, the NRL announced the latest title Rugby League Live 4 which was released on 28 October 2017.

In 2020, the NRL confirmed that a new Rugby League game is due for release in 2021.

List of games

See also 

Tru Blu Entertainment

References

2003 in rugby league
2003 video games
PlayStation 2 games
Rugby league video games
Video games developed in New Zealand
Video games set in Australia
Windows games
Xbox games